Connie Leyva (born February 19, 1967) is an American politician and union organizer, previously serving as a member of the California State Senate in the 20th Senate District from 2014-2022. She is a member of the Democratic Party.

Leyva was raised in Chino, California, where she attended public schools. She earned a Bachelor of Arts degree in communicative disorders from the University of Redlands.

Career 
Prior to being elected to the State Senate in 2014, she was president of the California Labor Federation. Leyva was elected to the California State Senate in 2014, receiving the endorsement of the local AFL–CIO chapter.

On January 6, 2022, Leyva announced that she would not run for reelection to the State Senate as newly approved redistricting maps put state Sen. Connie Leyva (D-Chino) in the same district as state Sen. Susan Rubio (D-Baldwin Park) and the two would have had to face off in the fall. On January 26, 2022, Leyva announced that she would be a candidate for the San Bernardino County Board of Supervisors, seeking to unseat Curt Hagman.  She was defeated by a wide margin.

In late October, 2022, the San Bernardino Community College District announced appointing Leyva as executive director of KVCR, when she completes her current elected term as state senator December 5. KVCR is a public radio dual licensee that also operates First Nations Experience, a digital multicast channel for Native American and Indigenous programming.

Personal life 
Leyva and her husband, Al, live in Chino, California and have twin daughters.

References

External links 
 
 Campaign website
 
 Join California Connie Leyva

Democratic Party California state senators
University of Redlands alumni
21st-century American politicians
Living people
1967 births
People from Chino, California
Women state legislators in California
21st-century American women politicians